Thompson Sound is an unincorporated locality on the east side of the sound of the same name, which is in the area of Tribune Channel and the Broughton Archipelago in the Central Coast region of British Columbia, Canada.

References

Unincorporated settlements in British Columbia
Central Coast of British Columbia